Walter James Romari (7 October 1907 – 1 September 1962) was an Australian rules footballer who played with Hawthorn in the Victorian Football League (VFL).

Notes

External links 

1907 births
1962 deaths
Australian rules footballers from Victoria (Australia)
Hawthorn Football Club players